feh is a lightweight image viewer aimed mainly at users of command line interfaces.
Unlike most graphical image viewers, feh does not have any graphical control elements (apart from an optional file name display) which enables it to also be used to display background images on systems running the X window system. feh offers six different operational modes which can be controlled via command-line flags; apart from the default slideshow there is thumbnail, index, montage, list, and multiwindow.

See also 
Comparison of image viewers

References

External links 
 

Free image viewers
Linux image viewers